Amores (a)Típicos is a Canadian-Brazilian podcast launched on February 7, 2022. The podcast tells stories of various couples and single people, focusing on the love experiences of autistic people.

History 
Amores (a)Típicos was created by host Sophia Mendonça and screenwriter Marcos Maia, with a focus on affectivity in autism in a plural way. At the time, Sophia, who is a transsexual woman and stars in the Mundo Autista YouTube Channel, was in a relationship with a cisgender and heterosexual man, who was autistic like her and worked as a writer for a television network. She became a researcher on loving accessibility during marriage, focusing on studying the marital relationships of social groups such as autistic people and transgender people, as well as the crossover between both populations.

The show was developed in partnership with the University of Western Ontario as part of the Defiças Portraits project, which brought an anthology of podcast episodes co-created by Brazilian artists about the experience of being a person with a disability in Brazil.  The podcast was also co-produced by the NGO Ateliê Ambrosina and featured an exhibition and visual arts, including photography, collage, drawings and sculptures.

Amores (a)Típicos had the participation of guests with different sexual orientations and different ages, in addition to actresses Ju Colombo and Isabela Garcia, known for acting in television series with great repercussion in Brazil. The podcast questions media stereotypes about the autistic spectrum and the idea of ​​a typical way of expressing feelings of love. In this way, Amores (a)Típicos seeks to encompass the greatest plurality of nuances and embodiments in the approach to romantic relationships of autistic people. The podcast gave rise to a series of academic works by Mendonça on the topics addressed, which were disseminated in both the Canadian and Brazilian scientific communities.

References 

Audio podcasts
Audio documentaries
Works about autism